Petros Petrosyan (December 24, 1968 – December 15, 2012) was an Armenian painter.

Biography
Petros Petrosyan was born on December 24, 1968, in Yerevan in the family of artists Hakob and Vera Petrosyan. In 1984 graduating from the School of Art, named after Hakob Kojoyan, entered the College of Fine Arts after Panos Terlemezyan. From 1988 - 1994 period. studied in Yerevan Fine Arts and Theatre Institute, the workshop of professor Mkrtich Sedrakyan. From  1998 has been member to the Union of Painters of Armenia, from the year 1998, Member of International Association of Fine Arts of UNESCO.

Exhibitions
	1997 - solo exhibition: Yervand Kochar Museum, Yerevan, Armenia  
	1997 - group exhibition: Union of Painters of Armenia, Yerevan, Armenia 
	1997 - group exhibition: National Gallery of Armenia, Yerevan, Armenia 
	1998 - group exhibition: Union of Painters of Armenia, Yerevan, Armenia 
	1999 - solo exhibitions: the United States
	2000 - solo exhibitions: Modern Art Gallery (Yerevan)
	2000 - solo exhibitions: United Nations Organization Armenia Office Exhibition Hall
	2002 - group exhibition ՝ Cyprus

Paintings
1994 - Tree Cutting; 
1995 – Noon;
1996 – Road;
1997 - Grief; 
1997 – Elegy;
1997 – Masks;
1998 – Cold Memories; 
1998 - Immortelles;
1998 - Butterflies;
1998 - Song of Our Days; 
1999 - Lonely man of Planet; 
2001 - Madonna; 
2001 - Crucifixion;
2001 - Adam and Eve.

Literature
 
 
 
 
 
 
 
 
 
 
  (catalogue) 
  (catalogue) 
  — II part (Encyclopedia)

References

External links
 Official Website

1968 births
2012 deaths
Armenian painters